Marcus Johansson may refer to:

Marcus Johansson (footballer, born 1994), Swedish footballer who plays for IFK Norrköping 
Marcus Johansson (footballer, born 1993), Swedish footballer who plays for Halmstads BK
Marcus Johansson (ice hockey, born 1979), Swedish professional ice hockey defenceman
Marcus Johansson (ice hockey, born 1990), Swedish ice hockey player currently playing for the Washington Capitals.